County of Le Hunte is a cadastral unit located in the Australian state of South Australia that covers land located in the centre of Eyre Peninsula.  It was proclaimed in 1908 and named after George Le Hunte who was the Governor of South Australia from July 1903 to February 1909.

Description 
The County of Le Hunte covers a part of South Australia associated with the western side of the centre of Eyre Peninsula located south of the Gawler Ranges.  It is bounded to the west by the County of Robinson, to the south by the counties of Musgrave and  Jervois, and to the east by the County of Buxton and to the north by County of Bosanquet.	

The county is served by the following major roads - Eyre Highway which passes through the county from east to west and the Tod Highway which passes from the south and which meets the Eyre Highway at Kyancutta.

Settlements include Minnipa, Yaninee, Pygery, Wudinna and Kyancutta which are located (from west to east) along the Eyre Highway and Warramboo being located on the Tod Highway.

The Port Lincoln to Wudinna line of the Eyre Peninsula Railway passes through the county from the south to the west following the alignment of the Tod Highway and then the alignment of the Eyre Highway west of Kyancutta.

Land use within the county includes primary industrial activity such as “cereal and legume cropping, pastures, and grazing of sheep and cattle,” and mining.  The following protected areas are located in the county - Cocata Conservation Park in the south-east corner while the Pinkawillinie Conservation Park occupies most of the county's northern-eastern corner.

Its extent includes parts of the local government areas of the Wudinna District Council on its western side and the District Council of Kimba on its eastern side with parts of the state's Pastoral Unincorporated Area located on its northern and eastern sides.

History
The County of Le Hunte was proclaimed on 4 November 1908.

The naming of the county after Governor Le Hunte who was the Governor of South Australia from July 1903 to February 1909, by the South Australian government follows “a precedent which was established in 1842’ when a county was named after Governor Gawler.

The following hundreds have been proclaimed within the county - Kappakoola, Mamblin, Minnipa, Palabie, Pygery, Wannamana, Warramboo, Wudinna and Yaninee in 1913, Pinbong in 1922, Pordia in 1925, Cootra and Koongawa in 1926, Hill in 1927, Cocata in 1928, and Corrobinnie and Peella in 1957.

Constituent hundreds

Location of constituent hundreds
The hundreds are laid out in four rows in the west–east direction as follows:	
 Cocata, Kappakoola, Warramboo and Cootra from west to east along the county's eastern boundary.
Pordia, Palabie, Wannamana, Mamblin and Koongawa
Yaninee, Pygery, Wudinna, Hill and Peella, and 
The most northerly row of hundreds consists of the Hundreds of Minnipa and Pinbong in the north-west corner of the county and Corrobinnie in the north-east corner of the county separated by an area of land that has not been proclaimed as one or more hundreds.

Hundred of Cocata
The Hundred of Cocata was proclaimed on 9 August 1928. It is mostly located within the gazetted locality of Cocata, with a section in Mount Damper.

Hundred of Cootra
The Hundred of Cootra was proclaimed on 4 November 1926.

Hundred of Corrobinnie
The Hundred of Corrobinnie was proclaimed on 7 February 1957. It is divided between the gazetted localities of Buckleboo and Pinkawillinie.

Hundred of Hill
The Hundred of Hill was proclaimed on 24 November 1927. It is located entirely within the broader gazetted locality of Pinkawillinie.

Hundred of Kappakoola
The Hundred of Kappakoola was proclaimed on 31 July 1913. It is nearly entirely located within the broader gazetted locality of Warramboo, with a small section in Cocata.

Hundred of Koongawa
The Hundred of Koongawa  was proclaimed on 4 November 1926.

Hundred of Mamblin
The Hundred of Mamblin was proclaimed on 31 July 1913. More than half of the hundred is located in the gazetted locality of Kyancutta, with a smaller section in Koongawa and a very small section in Warramboo.

Hundred of Minnipa
A majority of the hundred is contained in the broader gazetted locality of Minnipa, while the eastern and south-eastern section is contained in Yaninee.

Hundred of Palabie
The Hundred of Palabie  was proclaimed on 31 July 1913. The hundred contains the south-western half of the broader gazetted locality of Wudinna, while a small section in the south-west corner of the hundred forms part of Cocata.

Hundred of Peella
The Hundred of Peella  was proclaimed on 7 February 1957. Most of the hundred is contained in the broader gazetted locality of Pinkawillinie, while the north-eastern corner lies in Buckleboo.

Hundred of Pinbong
The Hundred of Pinbong  was proclaimed on 26 October 1922.

Hundred of Pordia
The Hundred of Pordia was proclaimed on 13 August 1925. The majority of the locality lies within the gazetted locality of Mount Damper, with a section of Cocata in the south of the hundred and Wudinna in the east.

Hundred of Pygery
The Hundred of Pygery  was proclaimed on 31 July 1913.

Hundred of Wannamana
The Hundred of Wannamana  was proclaimed on 31 July 1913.

Hundred of Warramboo
The Hundred of Warramboo  was proclaimed on 31 July 1913.

Hundred of Wudinna
The Hundred of Wudinna was proclaimed on 31 July 1913. Most of the hundred is contained within the broader gazetted locality of Wudinna, with small sections in Kyancutta and Pinkawillinie.

Hundred of Yaninee
The Hundred of Yaninee  was proclaimed on 31 July 1913. Most of the hundred is located within the gazetted locality of Yaninee, with a small section in the north-west corner in Minnipa.

See also
Lands administrative divisions of South Australia

References

Le Hunte
Le Hunte